The 2009–10 Greek Football Cup was the 68th edition of the Greek Football Cup. The competition culminated with the final held at Olympic Stadium on 24 April 2010. The final was contested by Panathinaikos and Aris. The last time that the two clubs were met in the Final was in 1940. Panathinaikos didn't win the Cup since 2004 and the last time that participated in a Final was in 2007. Aris on the other hand, didn't win the Cup since 1970 and the last time that played in a Final was in 2008. Panathinaikos earned the trophy with a 1-0 win over Aris.

Calendar

Knockout phase
Each tie in the knockout phase, apart from the semi-finals, was played by a single match. If the score was level at the end of normal time, extra time was played, followed by a penalty shoot-out if the score was still level. In the semi-finals were played over two legs, with each team playing one leg at home. The team that scored more goals on aggregate over the two legs advanced to the next round. If the aggregate score was level, the away goals rule was applied, i.e. the team that scored more goals away from home over the two legs advanced. If away goals were also equal, then extra time was played. The away goals rule was again applied after extra time, i.e. if there were goals scored during extra time and the aggregate score was still level, the visiting team advanced by virtue of more away goals scored. If no goals were scored during extra time, the winners were decided by a penalty shoot-out. In the round of 16, if the score was level at the end of normal time the two-legged rule was applied.The mechanism of the draws for each round is as follows:
In the draw for the second round, the teams from the second division are seeded and the winners from the first round were unseeded. The seeded teams are drawn against the unseeded teams.
In the draw for the Round of 32 onwards, the teams from the first division are seeded and the winners from the previous rounds were unseeded. The seeded teams are drawn against the unseeded teams.
In the draws for the Round of 16 onwards, there are no seedings and teams from the different group can be drawn against each other.

First round
The draw took place on 7 August 2009.

Summary

|-
|colspan="3" style="background-color:#D0D0D0" align=center|22 August 2009

|-
|colspan="3" style="background-color:#D0D0D0" align=center|23 August 2009

|}

Matches

Second round
The draw took place on 7 August 2009, after the First Round draw.

Summary

|-
|colspan="3" style="background-color:#D0D0D0" align=center|30 August 2009

|-
|colspan="3" style="background-color:#D0D0D0" align=center|2 September 2009

|-
|colspan="3" style="background-color:#D0D0D0" align=center|3 September 2009

 

|}

Matches

Additional round

Summary

|-
|colspan="3" style="background-color:#D0D0D0" align=center|23 September 2009

|}

Matches

Bracket

Round of 32
The draw took place on 7 August 2009.

Summary

|}

Matches

Round of 16
The draw took place on 2 November 2009.

Summary

|}

Matches

Quarter-finals
The draw took place on 22 January 2010.

Summary

||colspan="2" 

||colspan="2" 

|}

Matches

*The match was interrupted at the 69th minute due to the bad condition of field, that occurred from continuous raining. The match continued from minute that had been stopped, the following day.

Replay

Semi-finals
The draw took place on 22 January 2010, after the quarter-final draw.

Summary

|}

Matches

Panathinaikos won 3–1 on aggregate.

Aris won 4–2 on aggregate.

Final

Top scorers

References

External links
  Greek Cup 2006-2007 at Hellenic Football Federation's official site

2009-10
Cup
2009–10 domestic association football cups